Karin Vogel (born 4 February 1973) is a German hospital therapist and  last in the line of succession to the British throne. She is a descendant of Sophia of Hanover, the mother of King George I of Great Britain. As a therapist, she works with older people who have chronic pain.

References

People from Rostock
1973 births

Living people